Phyllonorycter stephanota is a moth of the family Gracillariidae. It is known from New South Wales and Queensland in Australia.

The larvae feed on Abutilon, Hibiscus, Malvastrum (including Malvastrum spicatum) and Sida species (including Sida subspicata). They probably mine the leaves of their host plant.

References

stephanota
Moths of Australia
Moths described in 1907